The taekwondo competitions at the 2024 Summer Olympics in Paris are scheduled to run from 7 to 10 August at the Grand Palais strip. 128 taekwondo fighters, with an equal distribution between men and women, will compete across eight different weight categories (four per gender) at the Games, the same amount as the previous editions since Beijing 2008. Each weight category is composed of sixteen taekwondo fighters; however, this figure may increase if additional athletes are invited and selected from the Refugee Olympic Team.

Qualification

The taekwondo competition for Paris will feature a total of 128 athletes (64 men and 64 women) across eight different weight categories, the same amount as the previous editions since Beijing 2008. Each National Olympic Committee (NOC) can enter a maximum of eight taekwondo fighters, with one per bodyweight category and four per gender.

The qualification window commences with the five spots awarded to the top-ranked practitioners in each of the eight weight classes (four per gender) through the World Taekwondo Federation (WTF) Olympic rankings and another spot to the highest of each weight category based on the merit points accrued in the WT Grand Slam Champions Series, scheduled for December 16–17, 2023 in Wuxi, China. At the beginning of the 2024 season, five continental qualification tournaments will offer the majority of the berths to the top two taekwondo fighters of each weight category from Africa, the Americas, Asia, and Europe; and to the highest-ranked from Oceania. 

The NOC containing at least two female or male taekwondo fighters through the ranking is deemed ineligible to participate in the respective Continental Qualification Tournament unless it relinquishes the places obtained. This pathway also applies to the host nation France with its reservation of two men's and women's spots (one in each weight category). Four further quota places will be entitled to the eligible NOCs interested to have their taekwondo practitioners compete in Paris 2024 through the Tripartite Commission Invitation.

Competition schedule

Medal summary

Medal table

Men's events

Women's events

See also
Taekwondo at the 2022 Asian Games
Taekwondo at the 2023 Pan American Games

References

 
Taekwondo competitions in France
2024
2024 Summer Olympics events
Olympic